The Basilica of the Assumption of Our Lady is a church in the Strahov Monastery, Prague. It was originally constructed as a Romanesque basilica and later rebuilt in  Baroque style.

External links

 Basilica of the Assumption – Prague-wiki

Churches in Prague